Ivano-Fracena is a frazione of the comune (municipality) of Castel Ivano,  Trentino, in the northern Italian region Trentino-Alto Adige/Südtirol, located about  east of Trento.  It was an independent comune until 1 July 2016. 

Frazioni of Trentino-Alto Adige/Südtirol